The Movement for Quality Government in Israel (HaTnu'a Lema'an Ekhut HaShilton BeYisrael) is an Israeli non-profit organization that claims a membership of about 17,000. Formed as a protest movement in March 1990 during the coalition crisis, it is today the leading public petitioner to the Supreme Court of Israel.

According to its chairman, Eliad Shraga, the Movement for Quality Government in Israel is funded primarily by the New Israel Fund.

External links
Official website , also 
Self-description of the Movement for Quality Government in Israel archived on the Israel Ministry of Foreign Affairs website

Non-profit organizations based in Israel
Organizations established in 1990